Meskwaki Casino is a Native American casino and hotel located in Tama, Iowa. It is owned and operated by the Sac and Fox Tribe of the Mississippi in Iowa, and opened in 1992.

Property

It also features slot machines, keno, bingo, and the sportsbook. The casino abuts a 404-room resort hotel.

External links
Official website

References

Casinos in Iowa
Hotels in Iowa
Native American casinos
1992 establishments in Iowa
Tama, Iowa
Casino hotels
Native American history of Iowa
Sac and Fox